Khar is a town of Muzaffargarh District in the Punjab province of Pakistan. It is located at 30°15'30N 71°1'30E with an altitude of 117 metres (387 feet).

Khar Sub Division is the main subdivision of Tribal District Bajaur. It consists upon 03 major Tehsils of Bajaur i.e. Tehsil Khar the most populated Tehsil, Tehsil Salarzai the bordering are of the subdivision with Afghanistan and Tehsil Utmankhel the bordering area of the tribal district with District Dir Lower.

Geography 

The Tribal District Bajaur/ex-Agency is  the smallest unit of the erstwhile Federally Administered Tribal Areas (FATA). Geographically, it holds strategic importance for Pakistan and adjoins Malakand Agency on the southeast, Dir District on the northwest, Mohmand Tribal District on the southwest and Afghanistan on the northwest. It has boundaries with

Climate 

The climate of Khar subdivision is moderate cold in the north i.e. hillock of Salarzai and south i.e. hillocks of Serisar. This is moderate in the central area stretch from north to south. The winter season is most sever due to excessive rain fall and snowfall in the north and south. In the central areas the summer season is extreme. The monsoon rains well here in Khar subdivision especially in the hilly areas of Salarzai.  As a whole, the northern hills of Bajaur  can be considered as a transition zone. The terrain of the agency is hilly, rugged, barren, and mostly arid. The hills in the district have been more or less completely denuded due to the dry climate of the area and excessive deforestation.

Culture and Heritage 

There is no major and famous cultural heritage in Khar subdivision. However, Lungi is the culture of the tribesmen. Hujra and Tang Takor is one of the famous cultural norms. Gabbar Cheena, Seri-sar, Sikandaro, Kohimore and Navy Dhand, Masjid Androon Khar and Eidgah Masjid are some historical places.

People and tribes 

Most of people of Khar subdivision are connected to farming and there are some educated people engaged in government services.  There is no major business and few businessmen, but some people are in the business of automobile and real estate trade. The people of Utmankhel are mostly autonomous and farm their qaumi shares of landed properties.  The people of Khar and Salarzai Tehsils were in the past under the control of Khans or Maliks, but today they are considerably autonomous.

There are two major tribes, Tarkani and Utmankhel, in the Khar subdivision. Tarkani occupy Salarzai except Mandal and Bartrass Shamozai (which are inhabited by Utmankhel) and Khar except Alizai and Maram Ghundai (which are inhabited by Utmankhel). The people of Tehsil Utmankhel are of the Utmankhel tribe.

The tribes are divided in subtribes and further into sections and subsections.

Languages 

The mother language of Khar subdivision is Pashto. Being laboring, running business and trading in other provinces the people are well familiar with Urdu. The minorities of Khar subdivision are urdu/ Punjabi speaking.

Sub-Divsion Specialty 

Specialty of the subdivision is that the people of hardworking, devoted and famous of hospitality. They are politically matured. This subdivision is dominant and Tehsil Khar is considered as center of the whole district. Almost all the departments and government installation are installed here in Tehsil khar i.e. specific Khar area. All head of the line departments are here in Civil Colony Khar the hub of the district and the whole district is being run from here.

Markets/Bazars 

Pashat Bazaar, Raghagan Bazaar, Khar Bazaar, Inayat Killi Bazaar, Sadiq Abad Market, Yousaf Abad Market, Qazafi Market, Mulla Killi Market, Loesam Market Sikandaro Market, Qazafi Market and Tawheed Abad Arang market.

Graveyard 
Graveyards have been allocated by the locals on the basis of their respective villages and specific areas. Some famous Graveyards are Dosai, Jar, Kanaser, Pashat, Loesam, Ghazi Baba Arang, Batai Alizai, Chinagai Utmankhel, Hayati, Manodehrai, Bandagai, Kulala, Mandal, Tangi Charmang, Tangi Salarzai, Raghagan, Inayat Killi, Inzari, Haji Lawang, Tang Khatta, Chingazo, Shandai Morh, Rashakai, Zoorbandar,

Attractions

References 

Populated places in Muzaffargarh District